Frank P. Wassenberg (born 2 May 1966) is a Dutch politician. He is a member of the House of Representatives for the Party for the Animals since 23 March 2017. He previously served in the House from 17 November 2015 to 18 October 2016 when he temporary replaced Esther Ouwehand. He serves in the States of Limburg since the 2015 elections, and previously served between 2007 and 2011.

Career
Wassenberg was born on 2 May 1966 in Heer, Maastricht. After completing his high school education in Maastricht in 1985 he went to study biology at Utrecht University and graduated in 1992.

Wassenberg was elected to the States of Limburg for the Party for the Animals in the 2007 elections. He served one four-year term. In the 2011 elections the party did not manage to obtain any seats. In the 2015 elections Wassenberg was once more elected to the States, as the sole representative of the party.

In November 2015 Esther Ouwehand temporarily resigned her seat in the House of Representatives due to health reasons. Wassenberg became her replacement with an expected term of four months. He has been reappointed multiple times since the passing of the first four months.

In September 2016 Wassenberg missed a vote on an initiative for reform of the organ donor system, this cause the initiative to reach a majority, while Wassenberg had planned to vote against.

Esther Ouwehand returned to the House of Representatives on 18 October 2016, ending Wassenberg's temporary replacement.

After the 2017 general election Wassenberg returned to the House, taking office on 23 March 2017.

References

External links
  Parlement.com biography

1966 births
Living people
21st-century Dutch politicians
Members of the House of Representatives (Netherlands)
Members of the Provincial Council of Limburg
Party for the Animals politicians
Politicians from Maastricht
Utrecht University alumni
20th-century Dutch people